The 2019 CTECH Manufacturing 180 is a NASCAR Xfinity Series race held on August 24, 2019, at Road America in Elkhart Lake, Wisconsin. Contested over 45 laps on the 4.048-mile (6.515 km) road course, it was the 23rd race of the 2019 NASCAR Xfinity Series season.

Background

Track

Road America is a motorsport road course located near Elkhart Lake, Wisconsin on Wisconsin Highway 67. It has hosted races since the 1950s and currently hosts races in the NASCAR Xfinity Series, NTT Indycar Series, NTTWeatherTech SportsCar Championship, SCCA Pirelli World Challenge, ASRA, AMA Superbike series, IndyCar Series, and SCCA Pro Racing's Trans-Am Series.

Entry list

Practice

First practice

Final practice

Qualifying

Qualifying results

Race

Summary
A. J. Allmendinger started on pole and remained in the lead until Stage 1, where he won the stage. Justin Allgaier had locked up the brakes in turn 1 in the gravel, but kept his car away from the tire barrier. The team had to make lengthy repairs to the vehicle. Cole Custer's car took some damage after he mowed down some banners, and Chase Briscoe took the stage 2 win when the leaders pitted.

Brandon Jones, who had to start the race at the rear in a backup car, blew a tire and damaged his right front. With 2 laps left, Gray Gaulding lost his brakes and spun out of control in the gravel. His rear-end got damaged, but track officials towed him out and his team made repairs to return to the race. Matt DiBenedetto (who led the most laps) lost control on the final turn while running second and ultimately finished one lap down. Christopher Bell (who struggled with handling issues during Stage 1) took the lead and managed to hold off Austin Cindric (who weaved his way through from 20th to second) to win the race.

Stage Results

Stage One
Laps: 10

Stage Two
Laps: 10

Final Stage Results

Stage Three
Laps: 25

After being lapped and struggling early on in the race in his Xfinity Series debut, Dick Karth did not complete the race and around lap 15, he was replaced by Timmy Hill. Since Karth started the race, he is officially credited with the 30th-place finish.

References

2019 in sports in Wisconsin
CTECH Manufacturing 180
NASCAR races at Road America
2019 NASCAR Xfinity Series